Mound Township is one of fifteen townships in Effingham County, Illinois, USA.  As of the 2010 census, its population was 3,648 and it contained 1,494 housing units.

Geography

Cities, towns, villages
 Altamont

Extinct towns
 East Meadows
 Southmore Heights

Cemeteries
The township contains these ten cemeteries: Bethlehem, Drysdale, German Methodist, Immanuel Lutheran, McCoy, Newman, Saint Clare Catholic, Union, Union and Zion Lutheran.

Major highways
  Interstate 70
  U.S. Route 40
  Illinois Route 128

Demographics

School districts
 Altamont Community Unit School District 10

Political districts
 Illinois' 19th congressional district
 State House District 102
 State House District 109
 State Senate District 51
 State Senate District 55

References
 
 United States Census Bureau 2007 TIGER/Line Shapefiles
 United States National Atlas

External links
 City-Data.com
 Illinois State Archives

Townships in Effingham County, Illinois
1860 establishments in Illinois
Populated places established in 1860
Townships in Illinois